Hilda Williams (1876 – 10 July 1922) was a British archer.  She competed at the 1908 Summer Olympics in London. Williams competed at the 1908 Games in the only archery event open to women, the double National round.  She took 25th (last) place in the event with 316 points.

References

External links
 
 
 

1876 births
1922 deaths
Archers at the 1908 Summer Olympics
Olympic archers of Great Britain
British female archers